In Indian mythology, Lauhitya (Lohity, Lohitya etc. as variations) was the easternmost country (it is also the name of a river) known to the people of the epic-age (Treta Yuga or Dvapara Yuga). Bhargava Rama is believed to have visited this place. The Pandava Bhima also visited this kingdom during his eastern military campaign to collect tribute for Yudhishthira's Rajasuya sacrifice.   A Naga king Lohita also ruled a territory close to Kashmira. It is not known if the Nagas in Kashmir.

References in Mahabharata

Naga King Lohita of the North 

A Naga named Lohita was mentioned at (2,9) along with other prominent Naga kings like Vasuki, Takshaka and Airavata.

Naga King Lohita ruled a territory close to the Kasmira. Arjuna has visited this kingdom during his military campaign to the north, to collect tribute for Yudhishthira's Rajasuya sacrifice.  Arjuna then defeated the brave Kshatriyas of Kashmira and also king Lohita along with ten minor chiefs. (2,26)

Lohitya, the easternmost territory 

Bhima, during his military campaign to the east, to collect tribute for Yudhishthira's Rajasuya sacrifice, subjugated in battle Paundraka-Vasudeva, the king of Pundra and king Mahaujah who reigned in Kausika-kachchha, and then attacked the king of Vanga viz Samudrasena and king Chandrasena and Tamralipta, and also the king of the Karvatas and the ruler of the Suhmas, as also the kings that dwelt on the sea-shore, and all Mlechchha tribes. He then advanced towards Lohity. Bhima then caused  all the Mlechchha kings dwelling in the marshy regions on the sea-coast, to pay tributes and various kinds of wealth. (2,29).

Lohitya River 

Lohitya is mentioned as a river along with many other rivers like Ananga, Pushpaveni, Utpalavati,  Karatoya, Vrishasabhya, Kumari and Rishikullya as the rivers of ancient India (Bharata Varsha) at (6,9). Lohitya is mentioned as a great river at (13,165). Here it is mentioned along with Sarayu and  Gandaki and other big rivers. A holy place named Urvasi (named after the Apsara Urvasi) is said to be situated in river Lohitya (13,25). Bhargava Rama is mentioned to have Created a pilgrim center at Lauhitya (3,85).

See also 
 Kingdoms of Ancient India
 List of Mahabharata people and places on Wisdom Library

References 

Mahabharata of Krishna Dwaipayana Vyasa, translated to English by Kisari Mohan Ganguli

Kingdoms in the Mahabharata